KCCM-FM (91.1 FM) is a radio station licensed to Moorhead, Minnesota, serving the Fargo/Moorhead area.  The station is owned by Minnesota Public Radio (MPR), and airs MPR's "Classical Music Network," originating from the Twin Cities. The station has inserts at least once an hour for local underwriting and weather. MPR also maintains an office and studio in Moorhead.

See also Minnesota Public Radio

External links
KCCM page at Minnesota Public Radio

Radio stations in Minnesota
Minnesota Public Radio
Classical music radio stations in the United States
NPR member stations
Radio stations established in 1971